Pusiola poliosia is a moth of the subfamily Arctiinae. It was described by Sergius G. Kiriakoff in 1958. It is found in Kenya, Nigeria and Uganda.

References

 

Lithosiini
Moths described in 1958
Moths of Africa